Dewa may refer to:

 Dewa, India, a town in Indian state of Uttar Pradesh
 Dewa Province, a province in Japan
 Dewa (band), an Indonesian rock band
 Dewa (people), a Sri Lankan people/population
 Dewa, Togo
 Dubai Electricity and Water Authority

People with the surname
, Imperial Japanese Navy admiral

See also 
 Deva (disambiguation)

Japanese-language surnames